KRCK-FM (97.7 MHz) is a radio station licensed to serve Mecca, California, broadcasting to the Coachella Valley area. The station's studios are in Palm Desert, while the transmitter is in a mountain range north of Bermuda Dunes. It is owned by Major Market Radio LLC, presently a debtor in possession.  The station was put into a receivership by court order in July 2020.  On March 15, 2021, VCY America, which owns Christian stations across the U.S., began operating the station under a local marketing agreement (LMA). On January 31, 2022, a court ordered possession and control of the station back to Major Market Radio LLC.

History

Early years
The Federal Communications Commission held a spectrum auction for the 97.7 frequency in Mecca in the late 1990s, and issued a construction permit to the winning bid, Playa del Sol Broadcasters, on April 7, 1998. During construction, the station was assigned the KRCK-FM call sign on February 1, 1999, and has kept the call letters for its entire existence. The station received its broadcast license in summer 2001. On June 20, 2001, KRCK-FM signed on. The station originally had an '80s rock format branded as "K-Rock", but was ordered to drop the use of the slogan due to a possible trademark infringement with KROQ-FM of Pasadena, after that, KRCK-FM flipped to Top 40 (CHR), branded as "Hot 97.7", this would happen in the summer of 2006.

CHR era
For the first 18 months, the airstaff consisted of Kid Corona in afternoon drive and Chase Martinez in nights, with the station being automated for the remaining dayparts. In 2007 the station introduced new sonic imaging  and rebranded as "Hot Hits 97.7 KRCK". In 2010, it rebranded again as "Hot 97.7 KRCK".

In 2016, the station was sold to Major Market Radio LLC, a subsidiary of Royce International Broadcasting Corp. (lead by radio entrepreneur Ed Stolz), owners of Alameda based KREV. The sale was approved on July 26, and was consummated on the 29th.

In 2018, KRCK placed its new HD radio transmitter on the air, with a Talk radio format heard on the HD2 format. Translators at 98.1 MHz and on 95.5 FM in the Coachella area, relay the HD2 subchannel, which itself is a simulcast of Las Vegas station KBET. The agreement was nullified after the VCY LMA came into effect.

ASCAP lawsuit and attempted Receivership sale
From April 2016 - June 2018, on behalf of W.B. Music and other music companies, ASCAP successfully sued Royce International Broadcasting Corp. and its subsidiaries for copyright infringement. The result was a $330,000 judgment, increased to over $1.3 million with attorney fees and sanctions. 

After Defendants were unable to pay, KRCK was transferred into a court-ordered receivership controlled by broker Larry Patrick on July 6, 2020, along with two other CHR stations mentioned in the lawsuit, KFRH in Las Vegas, and KREV-FM in San Francisco.

The Court Order appointing the Receiver authorized Larry Patrick to take control of the 3 named FM radio stations, and to "solicit offers for the sale of Defendants’ Radio Stations’ assets." However, that appointment order did not give Mr. Patrick control of the business entities. On December 30, 2020, it was announced that VCY America will acquire the three stations.

The December 28, 2020 Asset Purchase Agreement entered into by Larry Patrick has been criticized for being a "fire sale price" of $6 million for all three FM stations, and also because the contract was signed by "W. Lawrence Patrick, solely in his capacity as court-appointed receiver for Silver State Broadcasting LLC, Golden State Broadcasting LLC, and Major Market Radio LLC," while the appointment order clearly states that Patrick is receiver over the three FM stations only, not the business entities. 

On March 15, 2021, after Judge Jesus Bernal denied Stolz' bid to end the receivership and have the stations returned to him, VCY America began operating the three stations under an LMA (local marketing agreement) while the sale of the stations is being finalized.

The LMA, which costs VCY America $5,000 / month to operate all 3 FM Stations, has been criticized for being underpriced. A comparable LMA for a San Francisco FM Radio station was $80,000 / month for 1 station. As with the Asset Purchase Agreement, the LMA was entered into by Larry Patrick purportedly as receiver of the business entities, while the Order of Appointment states that Patrick is receiver over the FM Radio assets only.

On January 31, 2022, federal Judge August B. Landis apparently quashed the sale of the stations by ordering Receiver Larry Patrick to turn over control of KRCK-FM (and Stolz's other 2 FM stations) back to Stolz's companies.

References

External links

RCK-FM
Radio stations established in 2001
2001 establishments in California